Salem Common Historic District can refer to:
 Salem Common Historic District (Salem, Massachusetts), listed on the National Register of Historic Places (NRHP) in Essex County, Massachusetts
 Salem Common Historic District (Salem, New Hampshire), listed on the NRHP in Rockingham County, New Hampshire